Thioredoxin-dependent peroxide reductase, mitochondrial is an enzyme that in humans is encoded by the PRDX3 gene. It is a member of the peroxiredoxin family of antioxidant enzymes.

Function 

This gene encodes a protein with antioxidant function and is localized in the mitochondrion. This gene shows significant nucleotide sequence similarity to the gene coding for the C22 subunit of Salmonella typhimurium alkylhydroperoxide reductase. Expression of this gene product in E. coli deficient in the C22-subunit gene rescued resistance of the bacteria to alkylhydroperoxide. The human and mouse genes are highly conserved, and they map to the regions syntenic between mouse and human chromosomes. Sequence comparisons with recently cloned mammalian homologues suggest that these genes consist of a family that is responsible for regulation of cellular proliferation, differentiation, and antioxidant functions. Two transcript variants encoding two different isoforms have been found for this gene.

Interactions 

PRDX3 has been shown to interact with MAP3K13.

Clinical significance 

It has been demonstrated that serum peroxiredoxin 3 can be a valuable biomarker for the diagnosis and assessment of hepatocellular carcinoma  It has been shown that peroxiredoxin proteins protect MCF-7 breast cancer cells against doxorubicin-mediated toxicity. Additionally, it has been shown that peroxiredoxin 3 is overexpressed in prostate cancer and promotes cancer cell survival by defending cells against the damages incurred by oxidative stress.

References

Further reading